was a Japanese idol group consisting of Yui Ogura and Kaori Ishihara. The group was formed in 2009, and has released several singles and albums under the King Records label. On June 30, 2017, the group went on a hiatus to focus on their individual singing careers. Prior to the disbandment, Yui Ogura commented on her blog regarding the disbandment on April 5, 2017.

Discography

Albums

Studio albums

Compilation albums

Singles

References

External links
  

Anime musical groups
Japanese dance music groups
Japanese pop music groups
Lantis (company) artists
Musical groups established in 2009
King Records (Japan) artists
Pop music duos
2009 establishments in Japan
Japanese musical duos
Female musical duos